Lorieroceras lorieri is an extinct oncocerid nautilitoidean cephalopod belonging to the  family Nothoceratidae. Fossils are found in Lower Devonian marine strata of France.  Its shell is unusual among nautiloids in that it is a loosely coiled, turban-shaped helix that is sinistrally coiled.

References
Sweet, W.C. 1964; Nautiloidea -Oncocerida;  Treatise on Invertebrate Paleontology, Part K ; Geological Society of America and University of Kansas press; Teichert and Moore (eds). 
Sepkoski Cephalopod Genera

Prehistoric nautiloid genera
Fossil taxa described in 1926
Oncocerida